First Presbyterian Church, formerly the Franklin Presbyterian Church, is a church in Franklin, North Carolina, United States. It was built in 1856 and added to the National Register of Historic Places in 1987. In 1993, it was rewired, fitted with HVAC and given new interior walls.

See also
National Register of Historic Places listings in Macon County, North Carolina

References

External links

Presbyterian churches in North Carolina
Churches on the National Register of Historic Places in North Carolina
Churches completed in 1856
19th-century Presbyterian church buildings in the United States
Churches in Macon County, North Carolina
National Register of Historic Places in Macon County, North Carolina